Egypt participated at the 2009 World Games in Kaohsiung, Taiwan, from July 16, 2009 to July 26, 2009.

Competitors

Medal summary

Medal table

Medalists

2009 in Egyptian sport
Nations at the 2009 World Games
2009